Scutinanthe brunnea is a species of plant in the Burseraceae family. It is found in Brunei, Indonesia, Malaysia, and Sri Lanka.

References

Burseraceae
Least concern plants
Taxonomy articles created by Polbot